Qanat-e Malek, also rendered as Qanat-i-Malik, may refer to:
 Qanat-e Malek, Fars
 Qanat-e Malek, Kerman